The 2019 BIG3 season was the third season of BIG3. The regular season began on June 22, 2019 and ended on August 17, 2019. The playoffs began on August 25, 2019 and concluded with the championship game on September 1, 2019.

On January 11, 2019, the BIG3 announced that they would expand to 12 teams for the upcoming season, and move to two nights (consisting of three games each) per week. The league will also play in 18 cities, and allow players as young as 27 to compete in the league.

On April 4, 2019, BIG3 announced a new broadcast deal with CBS Sports, under which coverage moved to CBS and CBS Sports Network.

On April 18, 2019, BIG3 announced a new partnership deal with Toyota which introduces the RAV4 Point Shot. On April 29, 2019, BIG3 announced another partnership deal with cannabidiol brand cbdMD as the official jersey partner of the BIG3.

Venues

Draft
The 2019 BIG3 draft was held in Las Vegas, Nevada on April 12, 2019. 31 players were selected across three rounds.

Player selections

NOTES

Regular season

Week 1 (June 22 — Detroit, MI)
The first week of the first three games in the BIG3 Basketball League took place at the Little Caesars Arena, in Detroit, Michigan.

Week 1 (June 23 — Indianapolis, IN)
The first week of the second three games in the BIG3 Basketball League took place at the Bankers Life Fieldhouse, in Indianapolis, Indiana.

Week 2 (June 29 — Charlotte, NC)
The second week of the first three games in the BIG3 Basketball League took place at the Spectrum Center (arena), in Charlotte, North Carolina.

Week 2 (June 30 — Philadelphia, PA)
The second week of the second three games in the BIG3 Basketball League took place at the Liacouras Center, in Philadelphia, Pennsylvania.

Week 3 (July 6 — Birmingham, AL)
The third week of the first three games in the BIG3 Basketball League took place at the Legacy Arena, in Birmingham, Alabama.

Week 3 (July 7 — Atlanta, GA)
The third week of the second three games in the BIG3 Basketball League took place at the State Farm Arena, in Atlanta, Georgia.

Week 4 (July 13 — Providence, RI)
The fourth week of the first three games in the BIG3 Basketball League took place at the Dunkin Donuts Center, in Providence, Rhode Island.

Week 4 (July 14 — Brooklyn, NY)
The fourth week of the second three games in the BIG3 Basketball League took place at the Barclays Center, in Brooklyn, New York.

Week 5 (July 20 — Kansas City, MO)
The fifth week of the first three games in the BIG3 Basketball League took place at the Sprint Center, in Kansas City, Missouri.

Week 5 (July 21 — Oklahoma City, OK)
The fifth week of the second three games in the BIG3 Basketball League took place at the Chesapeake Energy Arena, in Oklahoma City, Oklahoma.

Week 6 (July 27 — Salt Lake City, UT)
The sixth week of three games in the BIG3 Basketball League took place at the Vivint Smart Home Arena, in Salt Lake City, Utah.

Week 7 (August 3 — Rosemont, IL)
The seventh week of the first three games in the BIG3 Basketball League took place at the Allstate Arena, in the Chicago suburb of Rosemont, Illinois.

Week 7 (August 4 — Milwaukee, WI)
The seventh week of the second three games in the BIG3 Basketball League took place at the Fiserv Forum, in Milwaukee, Wisconsin.

Week 8 (August 10 — Miami, FL)
The eighth week of three games in the BIG3 Basketball League took place at American Airlines Arena in Miami, Florida.

Week 9 (August 17 — Dallas, TX)
The ninth week of all six games in the BIG3 Basketball League took place at American Airlines Center in Dallas, Texas.

Standings

Notes
 Z clinched top seed
 Y clinched playoff spot
 X qualified for fifth place game

Playoffs

Week 10 (New Orleans, LA)
The semifinals and the fifth place game in the BIG3 Basketball League took place at the Smoothie King Center, in New Orleans, Louisiana.

Week 11 (Los Angeles, CA)
The third place game and the third BIG3 Championship game will take place at the Staples Center in Los Angeles, California.

Bracket

Individual statistic leaders

Awards
The awards for the 2019 season will be announce prior to the championship game.

 Most Valuable Player: Joe Johnson (Triplets)
 Coach of the Year: Lisa Leslie (Triplets)
 Player Captain of the Year: Joe Johnson (Triplets)
 Defensive Player of the Year: Amar'e Stoudemire (Tri-State)
 4th Man: Nate Robinson (Tri-State)
 Too Hard to Guard: Will Bynum (Bivouac)
 Best Trash Talker: Gary Payton (3 Headed Monsters)
 BIG Community Award: Ricky Davis (Ghost Ballers)

References

Big3
2019–20 in American basketball
Big